The University of Pau and the Adour Region (French: L'Université de Pau et des Pays de l'Adour, often known by the initialism UPPA) is a multi-site, public university located in southwestern France. Founded in 1972, it is based in Pau (département of Pyrénées-Atlantiques) but also in  Anglet, Bayonne, Tarbes and Mont-de-Marsan in the Adour river basin. Coming administratively under the Academy of Bordeaux, it is the third largest university in southwestern France (after Bordeaux and Toulouse), with almost 14,000 students.

History

Creation

The university was founded in 1970 but it can trace its origins back to 1549 when the Collège des Arts, an institute for the study of the humanities, was established in the royal town of Pau. More recently, the University of Bordeaux opened a branch in Pau in 1946 to teach legal subjects.  This branch known as the Institut d’études juridiques et économiques was directed by Robert Poplawski. It was then located in Villa Lawrence in Pau town centre.

Presidents
The university has been led by the following presidents:

Academics
As the university has grown it has added more courses and reorganised its academic units.  In 2018, the academic units were organised into three colleges: 
 College of European and International Studies (EEI)
 includes the Department of Interdisciplinary Studies at the Bayonne campus and the Institute of Enterprise Administration (IAE)
 located on two campuses: Pau and Bayonne.
 College of Social Sciences and Humanities (SSH)
 fusion of the Department of Letters, Languages, Human Sciences and Sport and the Department of Law, Economics and Management
 located on two campuses: Pau and Tarbes.
 College of Sciences and Technologies for Energy and the Environment (STEE)
 includes the Department of Sciences and Techniques, several specialist units and two University Institutes of Technology (IUT)
 located on four campuses: Pau, Bayonne, Anglet et Mont-de-Marsan.

Research
Research in the university is promoted in five thematic areas:
 Adapting coastal ecosystems, forests, mountains to make them more resilient
 Reconciling development, secure environment and preserved biodiversity
 Organising energy subsidiarity at territorial level.
 Questioning borders and taking up the challenge of differences.
 Representing and building the territories of the future.

For the period 2021-2026, research has been organised into a number of interdisciplinary centres located in each of the three Colleges:
 College of Social Sciences and Humanities (SSH)
 ALTER - Arts/Languages : Transitions and Relations - UR 7504
 ITEM - Identities, Territories, Expressions, Mobilities - UR 3002
 MEPS - Laboratory of Movement, Equilibrium, Performance and Health - UR 4445
 IFTJ - Institute of Research on Legal Transitions - UR
 TREE - Energy and Environmental Transitions
 
 College of European and International Studies (EEI)
 CDRE - Centre for Documentation and European Research - UR 3004 
 LIREM - Laboratory for Management Research - UR 4580
 IKER - Centre for Basque Language and Text Research - UMR 5478

 College of Sciences and Technologies for Energy and the Environment (STEE)
 ECOBIOP - Behavioral Ecology and Biology of Fish Populations - UMR 1224
 IPREM - Institute of Analytical Sciences and Physical Chemistry for the Environment and Materials - UMR 5254
 LFCR - Laboratory of Complex Fluids - UMR 5150 
 LIUPPA - Computer Science Laboratory - UR 3000
 LMAP - Laboratory of Mathematics and their Applications - UMR 5142
 NUMEA - Nutrition, Metabolism and Aquaculture - UMR 1419
 SIAME - Laboratory of Mechanical and Electrical engineering - UR 4581

Facilities

Pau campus

The main campus of the university is located in a large park in the north of the city of Pau, about twenty minutes ride from the town centre, but within the urban limits. The President's office is located there in the Présidence (Presidency) semicircular building.  The campus is bounded by Avenue de l'Université-Cours Léon Bérard-Boulevard Tourasse to the South, Avenue du Doyen Poplawski to the West, rue Audrey Benghozi and Boulevard Lucien Favre to the North and Allées Condorcet to the East.

There are facilities for all three colleges on the campus. the Ecole Nationale Supérieure en Génie de Technologies Industrielles (ENSGTI) and a School for Business Administration (Institut d'Administration des Entreprises)  There are two specialised university libraries, one for the Sciences Department, the other common to the Law and Arts Departments.

The College of Social Sciences and Humanities is located in the north-western part of the Pau campus. To the south is a large lawn much appreciated by students during summer months. The department is lodged in an elaborate three storey building with amphitheatre-like classrooms grouped at the eastern corner of the complex. The inner infrastructure is made of unpainted supporting concrete walls with lighter separation painted plaster walls. The exterior roofing is made of small clay tiles. Brick is used for sculptural elements such as the well-like artificial space in the centre of the inner patio, as well as pebbles for floor decoration. Large glass bays are also used as separation elements. Certain features of the building have been given names. The pillar-shape archives room near the student secretary is called 'the lighthouse', the sculpture-like structure in the patio is called 'the well', and the underground part of the building is referred to as 'the cellar'. The coffee-machines place and the eaves of the building are popular meeting points. The  concrete sign Faculté de Droit, d'Economie et Gestion serves as a bench in the shade of the trees. There is a nearby cafeteria called "L'Arlequin".

Campus life
A total of 8,700 students are located on the Pau campus.  This amounts to 63% of the UPPA student body. All matters regarding student life are handled in the Centre Local des Oeuvres Universitaires et Scolaire (CLOUS)  ( see : Bordeaux CROUS internet site). There are a number of dormitories (résidences universitaires) situated on the campus (résidence Gaston Phoebus) or near the campus or in town. Accommodation ranges from single rooms to small apartments. The main restaurant is called Cap Sud. It is situated to the South-West of the campus, which is where the maison de l'étudiant is located. There are many student societies on the campus.

Staff issues are handled by the Direction des ressouces humaines (DRH) services situated on the second floor in the Présidence building. There is an eatery at Cap Sud dedicated to University personnel (L'oasis). Staff belonging to IATOSS or ITRF personnel categories can also eat at the nearby Cité administrative's restaurant inter-administratif (RIA). There are a number of Unions present on the campus.

Sport at UPPA is organised by SUAPS service. There are a number of sporting facilities including André Lavie Stadium close to Pau's Léo Lagrange COSEC, UPPA sport hall (Halle des sports) close to Plein Ciel swimming pool and tennis courts, a football (soccer) field, an outdoor climbing wall on BU Droit-Lettres.

Nearby facilities
Located near Pau's university campus are a number of facilities:
 Pau Université E.Leclerc mall, with its L'île aux sandwichs, its Centre culturel book and computer store, located opposite the campus across Rue Allées Condorcet
 Carrefour Market mall, facing Présidence southern entrance
 Quick fast-food restaurant, a MégaCGR cinema,
 Pau's Université-La Poste post-office and a mail box along Dean Poplawski avenue

Also located nearby are the Lycée Saint-John Perse, the Helioparc site, a police station, an administrative centre, a Maison de l'agriculture, a church, several banks and a variety of stores.

Bayonne Campus
The UPPA Bayonne campus is located between the rivers Adour and Nive near the centre of Bayonne. There are facilities for the College of European and International Studies and the College of Sciences and Technologies for Energy and the Environment (STEE). Almost 2,500 students are enrolled at this campus amounting to 17% of the UPPA student population.

Anglet Campus
The UPPA Anglet campus is located at Allée du Parc Montaury, Anglet. It has almost 1,500 students (11% of UPPA students) in the College of Sciences and Technologies for Energy and the Environment (STEE). It is composed of:
 Sciences Anglet
 IUT de Bayonne (Département Informatique et GIM)
 ISABTP (Institut Supérieur Aquitain du Bâtiment et des Travaux Publics)

Tarbes Campus
The College of Social Sciences and Humanities (SSH) has facilities on the campus in Tarbes.  A total of over 800 students (6% of UPPA students) are enrolled at this campus.

Mont-de-Marsan Campus
The UPPA campus at Mont de Marsan has facilities for the College of Sciences and Technologies for Energy and the Environment (STEE) with 400 students (4% UPPA students).

Reputation

The university was ranked in the 1200+ band of world universities and in the 601-800 band for research in Life Sciences and in Engineering & Technology by Times Higher Education World University Rankings 2022. 

In the 2022 QS World University Rankings (QS) subject tables, it was ranked in the 301-400 band for Energy Science and Engineering.

Notable people

Faculty
 Manuel Tuñón de Lara (1915-1997) - Spanish historian
 Pierre Léon (1926-2013) - linguist and writer
 Françoise Deslogères (born 1929) - musician
 Antonio Rodríguez de las Heras (1947-2020) - Spanish historian
 Jean-Michel Roddaz (born 1948) - historian of ancient Rome
 Jean Michel Larrasket (1950-2018) - engineer
 David Diop (born 1966) - novelist; winner of 2021 International Booker Prize
 David Martimort (born 1967) - economist; winner of the Prix du meilleur jeune économiste de France in 2004
 Richard Chbeir (born 1975) - computer scientist

Alumni
 Alain Vidalies (born 1951) - lawyer and politician
 Coralie Frei (born 1951) - nurse and writer Comoros
 Martine Lignières-Cassou (born 1952) - mayor of Pau (2008–2014)
 Gunilla Asker (born 1962) - Swedish businesswoman
 Olivier Chauzu (born 1963) - Franco-Spanish classical pianist.
 Andy Byford (born 1965) - British transport executive
 Sonia Backès (born 1976) - politician, leader of the Caledonian Republicans party and the President of the Provincial Assembly of South Province 
 Isabelle Ithurburu (born 1983) - sports journalist

Recipients of honorary degree
 Evo Morales (born 1959) - Bolivian politician

References

External links

Official website
IUT des Pays de l'Adour 
Pau-online.com
UPPA on flickr, mainly photographs taken during Loi Pecresse and CPE French students movements

University
Educational institutions established in 1972
1972 establishments in France
University of Pau and the Adour Region
Law schools in France